Dihya (real name Zohra Aïssaoui) is an Algerian singer of Chaoui music.

Early life
Dihya was born in 1950 the village of Taghit near Tighanimine to Amar Aïssaoui Taghit and Ourida Meghamri of T'kout. She moved to France in 1958 at the age of eight.

Discography

Ekker d! Ekker d! (1981)
Usin d! Usin d! (1982)
Dzaïr essa (2005)

References
Nadia Bouseloua, Azeddine Guerfi, Rachid Mokhtari, Philippe Thiriez, Aurès, Vivre La Terre Chaouie - La cantatrice invisible, Chihab Éditions, Alger, 2011. ; p. 211

1950 births
Living people
20th-century Algerian women singers
21st-century French women singers
21st-century Algerian people